I Love Maria (also known as Roboforce) is a 1988 Hong Kong science fiction film directed by David Chung, produced by Tsui Hark and John Shum, and starring Hark and Shum alongside Sally Yeh, Tony Leung and Lam Ching-ying.

Plot
On one evening, Hong Kong's largest gang, the Hero Gang, uses an armed robot named Pioneer I to rob a bank and the police was unable to stop it. Maria (Sally Yeh) is a loyal member to the Hero Gang and its leader (Ben Lam) and did not hesitate to kill the mechanical maintenance staff who tried to escape. Master (Lam Ching-ying), an elder member of the gang was dissatisfied with Maria's style of cold-blooded killing. Maria later discovers that the leader is obsessed with robots and he created a female armed robot named Pioneer II, which was modeled after Maria's face. This leads Maria to develop a strong hatred towards Pioneer II.

Reporter Chong Chi Keung (Tony Leung) was fired because he was unable to photograph Pioneer I during the bank robbery. Curly (John Shum), who works at the Research Department of the police force, invents a cannon that may be able to fight robots, which attracts jealousy from his superior. Whiskey (Tsui Hark), a young member of the Hero Gang, feels dissatisfied about the gang's development and resigns. Later, Whiskey meets and befriends Curly at a bar and he is suspected to have betrayed the gang and the Hero Gang sends Pioneer II to kill him. While chasing Whiskey, Pioneer II malfunctions and is taken away by Whiskey (who has a secret crush on Maria) and Curly. Afterwards, Curly was wanted by the police for suspected collision with the Hero Gang.

Curly and Whiskey flees with the malfunctioned Pioneer II to a shack where Curly repairs its vanguard and reprogrammed it so that would only obey his commands, which also inadvertently causes it to produce human responses. Maria then brings Pioneer I to the shack to kill Whiskey. Curly commands Pioneer II to attack Pioneer I but the latter was armed with a "Counteract Bullets Device" making the former's attack ineffective. At this time, Master comes in masked and helps Whiskey and Curly escape the gang and flee to s shipyard. Reporter Chong also tracks them to the shipyard and performs a comedy skit with Pioneer II, who is gradually developing more human reactions. Chong then informs the police and Curly and Whiskey were arrested while Pioneer II fell into the hands of the Hero Gang again to be reprogrammed.

Later, Chong begins to sympathize for Curly and Whiskey and sneaks into the base of the Hero Gang. With the hep of Master, Chong was able to escape with Pioneer II from there while Master gets into a fight. Master, who raised every member of the gang from childhood, was dissatisfied with the gang's recent development and wants to terminate the leader's plan to create robots. When he was fighting with the leader, Master discovers that he himself has been made into a robot by the leader. Master soon lost the fight and was captured.

Chong gets Pioneer II to help Curly and Whiskey to escape from prison where afterwards, the four of them bring Curly's cannons to confront the Hero Gang at its base. Pioneer II fights the gang, Curly and Whiskey installs cannons around the base and Chong goes to save the soon-to-be executed Master. After defeating the gang, however, Pioneer II was captured by Pioneer I and Curly and Whiskey were suppressed by Maria and were unable to fire the cannons. At this time, Whiskey knocks down Maria to save Pioneer II and Pioneer II also ignores her own safety and shoots a cannon near herself and Pioneer I and destroys the robot it while saving Curly and Whiskey. The leader wants to activate the giant robot Pioneer III: The Ultimate Pioneer and escape. As the leader enters the navigation space of the robot, he was kicked off by Chong and Master whom had earlier sneaked in. Master and the leader fight on top of the robot's shoulder where Master uses the robots' giant joint to defeat the leader. Chong, however, mishandled the robot and flew up in the air but fortunately, Chong and Master successfully jumped out. The leader falls to his death from the roof and Maria also jumps off to die with him.

In the end, Curly, Whiskey and the now anthropomorphic Pioneer II lead a happy lives together while Chong dashingly abandons the pictures he took.

Cast

Reception

Box office
The film grossed HK$5,259,522 at the Hong Kong box office during its theatrical run from 10 to 16 March 1988 in Hong Kong.

Critical response
James Mudge of Beyond Hollywood called the film "a wonderfully creative and imaginative affair", as well as "hugely enjoyable and a film not to be missed by any aficionados of far out cinema."

References

Further reading

External links
 
 I Love Maria at Hong Kong Cinemagic
 
 

1988 films
1980s science fiction action films
1980s science fiction comedy films
Hong Kong science fiction action films
1980s Cantonese-language films
Robot films
Films set in Hong Kong
Films shot in Hong Kong
1988 comedy films
1980s Hong Kong films